Bhutahi Paterwa is a village development committee in Dhanusa District in the Janakpur Zone of south-eastern Nepal.Currently, it is situated in Mithila Bihari Municipality ward no. 01 of Madhesh Pradesh. At the time of the 2021 Nepal census it had a population of 
4,736 persons living in more than 1000 individual households in 9.3 km2.Most people living in this village follow Hinduism.The main inhabitants are Mandal, Yadav, Shah, Das, Thakur, Sada (Mushahar) and many more.

References

External links
UN map of the municipalities of Dhanusa District

Populated places in Dhanusha District